Alvin Hirsch Rosenfeld (born 1938) is an American professor and scholar who has written about the Holocaust, and the new antisemitism. He holds the Irving M. Glazer Chair in Jewish Studies at Indiana University, and is the Director of the Institute for the Study of Contemporary Antisemitism.

Rosenfeld earned his PhD from Brown University in 1967.

Books
A Double Dying: Reflections on Holocaust Literature, (Indiana University Press, 1980; paperback ed., 1988; German, Polish, and Hungarian editions). .
 Imagining Hitler (Indiana University Press, 1985; Japanese-language translation). .
 The End of the Holocaust, (Indiana University Press, 2011; German, Hebrew, Hungarian, and Polish translations). .
 Deciphering the New Antisemitism (Indiana University Press; 2015). .
 Anti-Zionism and Antisemitism: The Dynamics of Delegitimization (Indiana University Press; 2019).

Notable articles
 
 Progressive Jewish Thought and the New Anti-Semitism. American Jewish Committee. 2006

References

Living people
American male writers
American book editors
Jewish American academics
Indiana University faculty
Brown University alumni
Scholars of antisemitism
Historians of the Holocaust
New antisemitism
1938 births